Saritha is an Indian Malayalam film, directed by P. Govindan and produced by Suvarna Regha in 1977 . The film stars Vidhubala, Mohan Sharma, Bahadoor and Manju Bhargavi in the lead roles. The film has musical score by Shyam.

Cast
Madhu
Vidhubala 
Mohan Sharma 
Bahadoor 
Manju Bhargavi 
M. G. Soman

Soundtrack
The music was composed by Shyam and the lyrics were written by Sathyan Anthikkad.

References

External links
 

1977 films
1970s Malayalam-language films
Films scored by Shyam (composer)